Transylvania is the fourth album by gothic duo Nox Arcana. This album is a musical tribute to Bram Stoker's Dracula. The duo employs their musical storytelling concept to take their listeners through chapters of the classic novel—beginning with Jonathan Harker's voyage into the Carpathian Mountains, a ride in Dracula's ominous black coach, arriving at Castle Dracula, a rendezvous with Dracula's brides, and a foray into a gypsy encampment, and finally into the lair of the vampire.

As with previous CDs, the booklet artwork is supplied by Joseph Vargo, with illustrations and quotes from Harker and Van Helsing. The duo's website also offers some historical background for the inspiration of their album.

Nox Arcana took their subject matter very seriously when composing the music for Transylvania. The album was also used to score a televised edition of the 1922 silent film Nosferatu.

Track listing
"Transylvania Overture" – 2:01
"The Voyage" – 2:54
"Gossamer Mist" – 2:39
"The Black Coach" – 2:35
"Sentinels of Stone" – 0:44
"Into the Shadows" – 2:59
"Castle Dracula" – 2:56
"Visitors in the Night" – 0:57
"Brides to Darkness" – 2:34
"Grande Masquerade" – 4:14
"Memento Mori" – 2:28
"The Howling" – 1:20
"Nocturne" – 2:55
"Bats in the Belfry" – 0:35
"Gothic Sanctum" – 2:43
"Gypsy Caravan" – 4:13
"From Dusk Till Dawn – 0:53
"Night of the Wolf" – 3:59
"Echoes from the Crypt" – 2:37
"Shadow Hunters" – 2:51
"Lair of the Vampire" – 3:18 (+hidden track)

References

External links
 Nox Arcana official website
 Nox Arcana article: The Legend of Dracula (Vlad Tepes)
 Nox Arcana article: Transylvania Journals
[ Transylvania] at Allmusic

Nox Arcana albums
Halloween albums
2005 albums
Works based on Dracula
Music based on novels
Vampires in music